Below is a list of the media in the Columbus Metro Area in Columbus, Georgia.

Television
Bold denotes full-power television stations in the Columbus Metro Area.

Radio

AM broadcasting

FM broadcasting

Newspapers

The Ledger-Enquirer, the only daily newspaper in Columbus
The LocaL, a monthly magazine featuring art and entertainment news and featuresThe Columbus Times, a weekly publication featuring African-American perspectives of current eventsThe Bayonet, a weekly publication of news and events in Fort Benning and south Columbus.Playgrounds Magazine, a monthly entertainment and arts magazine (closed in 2017)The Saber, the Columbus State University campus newspaperTid Bits, a weekly publication featuring news throughout the southeastTo Do, a weekly publication featuring current eventsThe Chattahoochee Voice'''', The Chattahoochee Voice. Columbus, Georgia's only solely online newspaper. Servicing Metro Columbus since 2016.

See also
Columbus, Georgia
 Georgia media
 List of newspapers in Georgia (U.S. state)
 List of radio stations in Georgia (U.S. state)
 List of television stations in Georgia (U.S. state)
 Media of cities in Georgia: Athens, Atlanta, Augusta, Macon, Savannah

References

External links
 http://www.ledger-enquirer.com/
 http://www.ourtownjournal.com 
Columbus Enquirer Archive Digital Library of Georgia
 

Mass media in Columbus, Georgia
columbus